Secret People may refer to:

 Secret People (album), a 2003 album by Capercaillie
 Secret People (film), a 1952 British drama film
 The Secret People, a novel by John Wyndham